Metopochetus is a genus of stilt-legged flies. Crus is a subgenus. Species within Metopochetus are:

 Metopochetus aequalis
 Metopochetus aitkeni
 Metopochetus aper
 Metopochetus bickeli
 Metopochetus clarus
 Metopochetus corax
 Metopochetus curvus
 Metopochetus freyi
 Metopochetus impar
 Metopochetus lugens
 Metopochetus micidus
 Metopochetus ralumenis
 Metopochetus regius

References

Micropezidae
Nerioidea genera